Sally Hines (born 28 July 1967) is a British sociologist and gender studies scholar. She is Professor of Sociology and Director of Equality, Diversity and Inclusion at the Department of Sociological Studies at the University of Sheffield. She is the daughter of Barry Hines, the novelist and screenwriter whose most famous book, A Kestrel for a Knave, was turned into the 1969 film Kes.

Career
She earned a PhD in sociology at the University of Leeds in 2004 with the dissertation Transgender Identities, Intimate Relationships and Practices of Care, supervised by Fiona Williams and Sasha Roseneil.

She was Professor and Director of the Centre for Interdisciplinary Gender Studies at the University of Leeds until 2019, when she joined the University of Sheffield as Professor of Sociology.

Her research focuses on gender, sexuality, intimacy and the body, feminist theory, intersectionality, and citizenship. She is the co-founder and co-chair, with Natacha Kennedy, of the Feminist Gender Equality Network, a group "dedicated to countering anti-trans propaganda at home and abroad."

According to Google Scholar her work has been cited around 3,000 times and she has an h-index of 25.

Books
Is Gender Fluid?: A Primer for the 21st Century (2018)
Gender Diversity, Recognition and Citizenship (2013)
TransForming gender: Transgender practices of identity, intimacy and care (2007)
Transgender Identities

References

Living people
1967 births
British sociologists
Academics of the University of Sheffield
Academics of the University of Leeds